Itumbiara is  a municipality in the extreme south of the state of Goiás, Brazil.  Its population in 2020 was of 105,809 in a total area of 2,461,3 km2 (2020). Itumbiara is one of the most prosperous cities in Goiás and is a major producer of soybeans, corn, cattle, and milk.

Geography
Itumbiara lies 197 kilometers south of  the state capital, Goiânia, and is on the state boundary with Minas Gerais.

There are road connections with Goiânia  and São José do Rio Preto, state of São Paulo, by the national highway, BR 153. Brazil's most popular hot springs, Caldas Novas and Rio Quente, are located a short distance to the north.

The territory of the municipality is crossed by the Paranaíba River, the Meia Ponte, the Rio dos Bois and by several small rivers and streams.

Hamlets: Campo Limpo and Meia Ponte.

Political data
Mayor: Francisco Domingues de Faria (Chico Bala)
Number of council members:  10
Total number of eligible voters: 70,240 (2012)

Demographics
Population density in 2015: 37.71 inhabitants/km2
Population growth rate 1996/2007: 1.04.%
Total population in 2015: 100,548
Total population in 1980: 78,049
Urban population in 2010: 89,000
Rural population in 2010: 3,942
(Sepin/IBGE)

History
In 1824 the road was completed linking Uberaba and Anhanguera on the border between Goiás and Minas Gerais.  The government installed a tax collection post and the site was called "Porto de Santa Rita" or just "Porto".  Soon a chapel was built dedicated to Santa Rita and the settlement was known as Santa Rita do Paranaíba, after the great river that divides Minas and Goiás.  In 1909 a suspension bridge was built over the river.  In 1909 Santa Rita do Paranaíba became a municipality.  In 1943 the name was changed to Itumbiara (from a Tupi–Guarani language, meaning "Pathway to the Waterfall"), after a road built by Engineer Inácio Pais Leme connecting the town with Cachoeira Dourada, 40 km. away. Histórico dos Municípios  In 1966 the city was made the seat of the Roman Catholic Diocese of Itumbiara.

Economy
Itumbiara is a large producer of corn, soybeans and cotton.  The cattle herd is substantial, with almost one hundred and fifty thousand head of beef cows in addition to thirty thousand milking cows.  There is also a large poultry raising industry.  (All data below are from Sepin/IBGE)

Economic data
 Number of Industrial Establishments: 167 (/02/2007)
 Industrial District: Distrito Agroindustrial – DIAGRI  (2007)
 Dairies:
 Coop. Central de Laticínio do Estado de SP Ltda. ** Miqueline e Miqueline Ltda.
 Marajoara Ind. de Laticínios Ltda (06/2007)
 Banking Establishments:
 Banco ABN AMRO Real S.A.(1) – Banco do Brasil S.A.(2)
 BRADESCO S.A (1)
 Banco Itaú S.A.(3)
 CEF (1)
 HSBC Bank Brasil S.A –Banco Múltiplo (1)
 UNIBANCO-União de Bancos Brasileiros S.A.   (08/2007)
 Number of Retail Commercial Establishments: 1,180 (2007)

Animal raising'
 Poultry: (head) 429,220 (2006)
 Cattle (head) 152,640
 Swine: (head) 14,990
 Milk cows (head): 32,030

Main crops in planted area
Cotton: 900 ha.
Rice:  1,400 ha.
Sugarcane:  11,500 ha.
Corn:  6,550 ha.
Soybeans:  36,500 ha.
Sorghum:  5,300

Agribusiness
Major agro-industrial industries are:
Alca Foods (cereals)
Braspelco (leather exports)
Caramuru Alimentos (agribusiness, soy exporter)
Grupo Maeda (cotton, soy)
Pioneer Sementes (seeds)

Farm Data (2006) in ha.
Number of farms:               1,136
Total area:                  183,202
Area of permanent crops:       1,982
Area of perennial crops:     46,626
Area of natural pasture:    100,370
Persons dependent on farming: 4,000
Farms with tractors:            440 IBGE

Education (2006)

Schools in activity: 58
Total Students: 25,464
Literacy Rate: 89.0%(Sepin/IBGE 2000)
Higher education: In July 2007 there were 3 institutions of higher education in the city.  The schools were:
ULBRA (Lutheran University of Brazil)
UEG (Universidade Estadual de Goiás)
UNIFASC (Faculdade Santa Rita de Cássia)

Health (2006)
Hospitals:  3
Beds: 232
Infant mortality rate: 21.55 (in 1,000 live births)
(Sepin/IBGE 2000)
MHDI:  0.782
State ranking:  27 (out of 242 municipalities in 2000)
National ranking:  1,018 (out of 5,507 municipalities in 2000)
For the complete list see Frigoletto

Tourism
Itumbiara's main attraction is its nautical tourism. The artificial lake Itumbiara can be used for all types of water sports. On the second Sunday of August the traditional river procession of Our Lady of the Graces takes place. Other touristic points are the Vermelhão Lake, two waterfalls, Salto de Santa Maria de Cima and Saltos de Santa Maria do Meio. The Affonso Penna Bridge, also known as the "Crystal Bridge", which links the states of Goiás and Minas Gerais. Itumbiara also has a Kart circuit, which hosts regional, national and international events, with a capacity for 5,000 people.

The city is served by Francisco Vilela do Amaral Airport.

Sport
Itumbiara EC competed in the Série A in 1979 and won the state championship in 2008. Their home is the Estádio JK.

Sister cities 
  – Rio Verde
  – Quirinópolis

Notable people
Dante do Amaral, volleyball player
Zé Roberto, football player
Jorge e Mateus, Sertanejo singers
Ricardo Boiadeiro, football player

See also 
 List of municipalities in Goiás

References
Frigoletto
 Sepin

External links
City Hall of Itumbiara website
Itumbiara, Goiás, Brazil

Municipalities in Goiás
Populated places established in 1909
1909 establishments in Brazil